The 2005 Delaware Fightin' Blue Hens football team represented the University of Delaware as a member of the South Division of the Atlantic 10 Conference (A-10) during the 2005 NCAA Division I-AA football season. Led by fourth-year head coach K. C. Keeler, the Fightin' Blue Hens compiled an overall record of 6–5 with a mark of 3–5 in conference play, placing in a three-way tie for third in the A-10's South Division. The team played home games at Delaware Stadium in Newark, Delaware.

Schedule

References

Delaware
Delaware Fightin' Blue Hens football seasons
Delaware Fightin' Blue Hens football